Stearamidopropyl dimethylamine is an ingredient in some types of hair conditioner. It has antistatic, emulsifying, hair conditioning, and surfactant properties. It is water soluble, readily biodegradable, and mildly toxic to aquatic life.

References

External links
 

Fatty acid amides
Cosmetics chemicals
Dimethylamino compounds